Haradanahalli is a village in the Holenarasipur Taluk of Hassan District in the state of Karnataka, India. Haradanahalli is home town of 11th Prime Minister of India, H. D. Deve Gowda who was born on 18 May 1933 in Haradanahalli village.

Notable Person 

 H. D. Deve Gowda, 11th Prime Minister of India from June 1996 to April 1997.
 H. D. Revanna, Member of the Legislative Assembly in the Indian state of Karnataka
 H. D. Kumaraswamy, 8th Chief Minister of Karnataka

External links
 Mood upbeat in Haradanahalli, The Hindu, 29 January 2006
 Deve Gowda to make Haradanahalli a model village, The Hindu, 8 February 2005
 Indian Premier's Roots May Be Clue to His Course, New York Times, 23 June 1996 subscription needed for full article

Villages in Hassan district